The lemon pleurobranch (Berthellina granulata) is a species of sea slug, a marine gastropod mollusc in the family Pleurobranchidae.

Description
The lemon pleurobranch is a small smooth oval pleurobranch. The animal is yellow- to orange-coloured and often has white spots. There are two rolled rhinophores joined at their bases on the head. Like all other sidegill slugs, there is a single gill on the right hand side of the body.

The animal grows up to 40 mm in total length.

Distribution
This animal has been found off the whole southern African coast and is known throughout the Indo-Pacific to Hawaii.

Ecology
The species is thought to be a scavenger. Its egg mass is an upright orange collar of one whorl.

References

External links 

Pleurobranchidae
Gastropods described in 1848
Taxa named by Christian Ferdinand Friedrich Krauss